Clube Rugby São Miguel is a rugby team based in the neighbourhood of São Miguel in Lisbon, Portugal. As of the 2012/13 season, they play in the Second Division of the Campeonato Nacional de Rugby (National Championship).

History
The club was founded in 1970. After a gap in activity the club returned to activity in 2009 following a large meeting of former players and families to celebrate the 40th anniversary of Afonso Costa Pereira.

In 2010 the club returned to competition with the senior team playing the II Division of the Portuguese Championship. In 2012-2013 the team finished 2nd and was promoted to the 1st Division. In 2017/2018 the senior team reached the final and almost got promoted to Honor Division however they lost against CRAV.

External links
Clube Rugby São Miguel

Portuguese rugby union teams
Rugby clubs established in 1970
Sport in Lisbon
1970 establishments in Portugal